The Czechoslovakia junior football team was the under-16 (continental competitions) and under-17 (world competitions) football team of Czechoslovakia. It was controlled by the Czechoslovak Football Association.

Despite the dissolution of Czechoslovakia in January 1993, the team played until May 1994. The present-day Czech Republic national under-17 football team is recognized as the successor of the Czechoslovakia team. The country of Slovakia is represented by the Slovak U-17 national team.

UEFA U-16 Championship record

FIFA U-16/17 World Cup record

See also 
 UEFA European Under-17 Football Championship
 FIFA U-17 World Cup

References

External links
 UEFA Under-17 website Contains full results archive
 The Rec.Sport.Soccer Statistics Foundation Contains full record of U-17/U-16 Championships.

European national under-16 association football teams
Czechoslovakia national football team